A bema was an elevated platform used as an orator's podium in ancient Athens. The term can refer to the raised area in a  sanctuary. In Jewish synagogues, where it is used for Torah reading during services, the term used is bima or bimah.

Ancient Greece

The Ancient Greek bēma means both 'platform' and 'step', being derived from bainein ('to go'). The original use of the bema in Athens was as a tribunal from which orators addressed the citizens as well as the courts of law, for instance, in the Pnyx. In Greek law courts the two parties to a dispute presented their arguments each from separate bemas.

Judaism

Etymology
The post-Biblical Hebrew bima, 'platform' or 'pulpit', is almost certainly derived from the Ancient Greek word for a raised platform, bema. A philological link to the Biblical Hebrew bama, 'high place' has been suggested.

Alternative names
The bimah (Hebrew plural: bimot) in synagogues is also known as the almemar or almemor among some Ashkenazis (from the Arabic, al-minbar, meaning 'platform'). Among Sephardic Jews it is known as a tevah (literally 'box, case' in Hebrew) or migdal-etz ('tower of wood').

Purpose
The importance of the bimah is to show that the reader is the most important at that moment in time, and to make it easier to hear their reader of the Torah.

Description and use
The bimah became a standard fixture in synagogues from which the weekly Torah portion (parashah) and the haftarah are read.

In antiquity the bimah was made of stone, but in modern times it is usually a rectangular wooden platform approached by steps.

The synagogue bimah is typically elevated by two or three steps, as was the bimah in the Temple. A raised bimah will typically have a railing. A lower bimah (even one step) will typically have a railing as a practical measure to prevent someone from inadvertently stepping off.

In Orthodox Judaism, the bimah is located in the center of the synagogue, separate from the Ark. In other branches of Judaism, the bimah and the Ark are joined together. Prior to Reform Judaism, all synagogues had their bimah in the middle . The Reform movement moved theirs close to or around the aron kodesh (Holy Ark).

At the celebration of the Shavuot holiday when synagogues are decorated with flowers, many synagogues have special arches that they place over the bimah and adorn with floral displays.

Christianity

The ceremonial use of a bema carried over from Judaism into early Christian church architecture. It was originally a raised platform with a lectern and seats for the clergy, from which lessons from the Scriptures were read and the sermon was delivered. In Western Christianity the bema developed over time into the chancel (or presbytery) and the pulpit.

In Byzantine, West Syriac and Alexandrian Rites of Eastern Christianity bema generally remains the name of the platform which composes the sanctuary; it consists of both the area behind the iconostasion and the platform in front of it from which the deacon leads the ektenias (litanies) together with the ambo from which the priest delivers the sermon and distributes Holy Communion. It may be approached by one or several steps. The bema is composed of the altar (the area behind the iconostasion), the soleas (the pathway in front of the iconostasion), and the ambo (the area in front of the Holy Doors which projects westward into the nave). Orthodox laity do not normally step up onto the bema except to receive Holy Communion.

Islam
In Islam, a pulpit, called minbar, in a standard furnishing in every Friday mosque. The earliest record of a minbar dates back to between 628 and 631 CE.

See also
 Ambon (liturgy)
 High place, raised place of worship
 Templon
 Tribune (architecture)

References

External links

Sacral architecture
Synagogue architecture
Pulpits
Church architecture
Eastern Christian liturgical objects
Architecture of Athens
Ancient Athens